Carmilla is a Canadian web series, based on the book of the same name, starring Elise Bauman and Natasha Negovanlis, which premiered on Vervegirl  YouTube channel on August 19, 2014. The series follows Laura, a freshman student, as she narrates her investigation on the mysterious disappearance of her roommate through her camera, when she is suddenly assigned a mysterious new roommate named Carmilla.

The first season began on August 19, 2014 and concluded on December 2, 2014, consisting of a total of 36 episodes that have a length of three to seven minutes of running time. A Christmas special aired on December 24, 2014, with a length of 7 minutes. A second season was announced on December 9, 2014 and premiered on June 2, 2015; it consisted of 36 episodes and concluded on October 1, 2015, with the season finale earning a length of 16 minutes. 

Following the conclusion of the second season, a Season Zero was announced, which premiered on October 22, 2015, on both Vervegirl and U by Kotex YouTube channels, and it is planned to contain 12 episodes, with the remaining episodes premiering on the U by Kotex channel. Season Zero takes place after season 2 but focus on events that transpired prior to the first two seasons.

As of November 17, 2015, 82 episodes of Carmilla, including the Christmas special, have premiered on Vervegirl and U by Kotex YouTube channels. Season Zero premiered on October 22, 2015, and concluded on November 24, 2015. The third and final season consists of 36 episodes and was split into three acts. Act I, which contains the first 17 episodes of the season, aired on September 15, 2016. Act II contains episodes 18-24 and aired on September 29, 2016. Act III contains episodes 25-36 and aired on October 13, 2016.

Series overview

Episodes

Season 1 (2014)

Special episode

Season 2 (2015)

Season Zero (2015)
It was announced on October 1, 2015, following the release of the season two finale, that a Season Zero would air on October 22, 2015 on the Vervegirl YouTube channel. It will be consisted of 12 episodes. The first episode premiered on the Vervegirl channel but the rest of the season premiered on the U by Kotex YouTube channel.

Season 3 (2016) 
It was announced in early September 2016 that the third season of Carmilla would be its last. It featured 36 episodes and, unlike previous seasons, airing of the episodes was split into three acts, with the first act containing the first 17 episodes announced to premiere on KindaTV's YouTube channel on September 15, 2016. Act II premiered on September 29, 2016 and Act III premiered on October 13, 2016 with the series' final episodes.

References

Carmilla